"Slow an' Easy" is a song by the English rock band Whitesnake from their 1984 album Slide It In. The album provided the group with a commercial breakthrough in the United States, and this specific song, which was released as a promo single, became a hit on rock radio. "Slow an' Easy" and "Love Ain't No Stranger" reached #17 and #34 on Billboard's Mainstream Rock Tracks chart, respectively.

Background
The song was co-written by singer David Coverdale and guitarist Micky Moody, who was the only original member, besides Coverdale, left in the band. Moody was possibly the one that influenced the bluesy style of "Slow An' Easy"; most of the material on Slide It In took influence from contemporary glam metal in terms of sound, in contrast to the earlier, blues rock based albums of the band.

In 25th Anniversary Edition of Slide It In, Coverdale comments on the songs recording by saying:

"Slow & Easy was recorded at 4 in the morning in Munich after a serious night's partying...Most of the vocals is just a live 'jam' lyric I made up to inspire the band as we recorded...I played around with the lyric later to try and make some sense of it..."

Although Moody did co-write and play the song, he soon left the band after the album's release. When guitarist John Sykes joined the band, Moody's guitars were replaced by Sykes' (along with Colin Hodgkinson's bass tracks being replaced by Neil Murray's, and Jon Lord's keyboards by Bill Cuomo). The song also features drumming by Cozy Powell. Most of the song features him kicking the bass drum, with some fills thrown in between the verses. A more basic drum beat is only prominent in the chorus and during the guitar solo.

A music video was also made for the song, which also helped to expose American audiences to Whitesnake. The music video features the band performing the song on a stage, which is inter-cut with scenes of a car crash and a woman whose necklace is strangling her.

Track list
Slow an' Easy (LP Version) - 6:08
Slow an' Easy (Edit) - 4:12

Personnel

UK release
 David Coverdale – lead vocals
 Micky Moody – guitars
 Mel Galley – guitars, backing vocals
 Colin Hodgkinson – bass
 Cozy Powell – drums
 Jon Lord – keyboards

US release
 David Coverdale – lead vocals
 John Sykes – guitars
 Mel Galley – guitars, backing vocals
 Neil Murray – bass
 Cozy Powell – drums
 Jon Lord – keyboards

Charts

References 

Whitesnake songs
1984 songs
Song recordings produced by Martin Birch
Songs written by Micky Moody
Songs written by David Coverdale
British blues rock songs
Geffen Records singles